Noura Alktebi is a Paralympic athlete from the United Arab Emirates with cerebral palsy.

Career 

She represented the United Arab Emirates at the 2016 Summer Paralympics held in Rio de Janeiro, Brazil. She won the silver medal in the women's shot put F32 event. She also competed in the women's club throw event where she finished in 6th place.

In 2019, she finished in 4th place in both the women's shot put F32 and women's club throw F32 events at the 2019 World Para Athletics Championships held in Dubai, United Arab Emirates. As a result, she has qualified to represent United Arab Emirates at the 2020 Summer Paralympics in these events.

She finished in 6th place in the women's club throw F32 event at the 2020 Summer Paralympics held in Tokyo, Japan. She finished in 4th place in the women's shot put F32 event.

Achievements

References

External links 
 

Living people
Year of birth missing (living people)
Place of birth missing (living people)
Emirati female shot putters
Track and field athletes with cerebral palsy
Paralympic athletes of the United Arab Emirates
Athletes (track and field) at the 2016 Summer Paralympics
Athletes (track and field) at the 2020 Summer Paralympics
Medalists at the 2016 Summer Paralympics
Paralympic silver medalists for the United Arab Emirates
Paralympic medalists in athletics (track and field)
21st-century Emirati women